Bart Simpson is a Canadian producer and director of documentary and fiction films. He started his education in political science and philosophy, however quickly transferred those interests to a variety of media arts.

Bart Simpson is best known for producing the feature documentary The Corporation with his former production company FOX in Vancouver, Canada. The film has won 26 awards and commendations, including major awards at the Sundance Film Festival, Toronto International Film Festival, and International Documentary Filmfestival Amsterdam. It is the highest-grossing domestic documentary in Canadian history, and is in the top 40 documentaries in the U.S.

Simpson acted as Canadian producer on Moebius Redux featuring illustrator Jean Giraud, which won Best Film at Comicon International, and acted in the same capacity for the feature documentary Bananas!* with Swedish director Fredrik Gertten. The film was hit with a lawsuit from Dole Food Company in summer 2009. Subsequently, Gertten directed the film Big Boys Gone Bananas!*, which featured the Bananas!* filmmaking team including Simpson, and told the story of their fight against Dole as a First Amendment case. It premiered in the US at the Sundance Film Festival in 2012.
In 2017, Simpson premiered his film Brasília: Life After Design at the Sheffield Doc/Fest.

Simpson is a past National Chairperson of the Documentary Organization of Canada, and has spoken widely in Canada and abroad on documentary policy and practice.

References

External links
 
 Bio from The Corporation
 The Documentary Organization of Canada/Documentaristes du Canada

Canadian documentary film producers
Canadian documentary film directors
Living people
Year of birth missing (living people)
Place of birth missing (living people)